The Clearwater River is a river located in the Clearwater Wilderness, in the Cascade Range in Pierce County, Washington. The river drains the wilderness area and is a tributary of the White River.

See also
List of rivers in Washington

References

External links
 

Rivers of Washington (state)
Rivers of Pierce County, Washington